Platanthera calceoliformis is a species of orchid endemic to north-western Yunnan province, China. It is listed as an endangered species on the IUCN Red List.

Taxonomy
The species was first described by William Wright Smith in 1921 as Herminium calceoliforme, having been collected by George Forrest in 1914 on the watershed between the Mekong and Yangtze rivers.
It has been placed in several genera at different times, including the monotypic genus Smithorchis.  A molecular phylogenetic study in 2014 found that it was deeply embedded in a clade of Platanthera species, and so it was transferred to that genus as Platanthera calceoliformis.

References

Bibliography

External links 

calceoliformis
Endangered plants
Endemic orchids of China
Endemic flora of Yunnan
Orchids of Yunnan
Plants described in 1921
Taxonomy articles created by Polbot
Taxobox binomials not recognized by IUCN